Annabelle Jaramillo (born 1940 or 1941) is a retired Latina American politician from the state of Oregon. She served on the Board of Commissioners of Benton County for five terms, from 2001 to 2021. Jaramillo was one of the first Latinas to hold elected office in Oregon. While in office, she was a strong advocate for minority and LGBT civil rights.

Early life and education
In the late 1940s, Jaramillo's mother attempted to enroll her in third grade in Colorado, only to find that the school was racially segregated. Her mother immediately staged a brief sit-in and successfully pushed the school to integrate. Jaramillo became the first student of color in her classroom. This experience inspired Jaramillo to support civil rights and LGBT rights throughout her life.

Jaramillo has bachelors and Master's degrees in biology from Portland State University.

Career

Early Career
Jaramillo's initial career was as a research botanist for the US Forest Service. In that role, she gradually became more involved in diversity, equity, and inclusion efforts for Forest Service employees. She eventually became the president of National Image Inc., an organization that advocated for equal employment opportunities for Hispanics in the federal government. Jaramillo then moved on to a number of managerial positions in Oregon's state government, including serving as Citizens' Representative for Governor John Kitzhaber, from 1995-2000 and as the Executive Director of the Oregon Commission on Hispanic Affairs.

Political Career
Jaramillo served on the Board of Commissioners of Benton County for five terms, from 2001 to 2021.

Volunteer
Jaramillo has been a member of numerous public and nonprofit boards. She served as president of the Oregon Women's Political Caucus. She also served on the Oregon Progress Board, the Oregon Sustainability Board, and the Federal Forestlands Advisory Committee.

LGBT rights advocacy
In 1991, Jaramillo managed a successful campaign in Corvallis to defeat a discriminatory charter amendment promoted by the Oregon Citizens Alliance. In 2004, Jaramillo and fellow Benton County Commissioner Linda Modrell voted (2-1) for the county to begin issuing marriage licenses to same-sex couples, following Multnomah County's lead and in defiance of requests by Governor Ted Kulongoski and Attorney General Hardy Myers. Following threats of arrest by the Attorney General, the Benton County Commission voted (3-0) to instead to stop issuing all marriage licenses - straight and gay. Benton County only resumed issuing marriage licenses to straight couples five months later, following a court order. Jaramillo later reflected, "If we were going to end up with discrimination, we weren't going to issue marriage licenses to anyone."

Electoral History

References

External links
 Jaramillo Papers at Oregon State University
 Jaramillo's Campaign Finance Filings with Oregon Secretary of State

Living people
Date of birth missing (living people)
Oregon Democrats
Politicians from Corvallis, Oregon
County commissioners in Oregon
Hispanic and Latino American people
American politicians of Mexican descent
American environmentalists
American women environmentalists
American LGBT rights activists
Year of birth missing (living people)
Hispanic and Latino American people in Oregon politics
Women civil rights activists
21st-century American women